Tineidae is a family of moths in the order Lepidoptera described by Pierre André Latreille in 1810. Collectively, they are known as fungus moths or tineid moths. The family contains considerably more than 3,000 species in more than 300 genera. Most of the tineid moths are small or medium-sized, with wings held roofwise over the body when at rest. They are particularly common in the Palaearctic, but many occur elsewhere, and some are found very widely as introduced species.

Tineids are unusual among Lepidoptera as the larvae of only a very small number of species feed on living plants, the majority feeding on fungi, lichens, and detritus. The most familiar members of the family are the clothes moths, which have adapted to feeding on stored fabrics and led to their reputation as a household pest. The most widespread of such species are the common clothes moth (Tineola bisselliella), the case-bearing clothes moth (Tinea pellionella), and the carpet moth (Trichophaga tapetzella); the brown-dotted clothes moth (Niditinea fuscella) despite its name, preferentially feeds on feathers in bird nests.

One remarkable genus is Ceratophaga, whose members feed exclusively on pure keratin in the form of the horns and hooves of dead mammals and even the shells of dead tortoises.

Systematics

Subfamilies and notable genera
Some species also are listed; for others see genus accounts.
Dryadaulinae
 Brachydoxa
 Dryadaula Meyrick, 1893
Erechthiinae
 Anastathma
 Callicerastis (sometimes in Erechthias)
 Comodica
 Erechthias Meyrick, 1880
 Mecomodica (sometimes in Comodica or Erechthias)
 Petula
 Phthinocola
 Pisistrata
 Pontodryas
 Thuriostoma
Euplocaminae
 Euplocamus Latreille, 1809

Hapsiferinae
 Agorarcha
 Briaraula
 Callocosmeta
 Chrysocrata
 Cimitra
 Colobocrossa
 Cubitofusa
 Cynomastix
 Dasyses
 Hapsifera
 Hapsiferona
 Paraptica
 Parochmastis
 Phyciodyta
 Pitharcha
 Rhinophyllis
 Tiquadra
 Trachycentra
 Zygosignata

Harmacloninae
 Harmaclona
 Micrerethista
Hieroxestinae
 Amphixystis
 Archemitra
 Asymplecta
 Crobylophanes Meyrick, 1938
 Kermania
 Mitrogona Meyrick, 1920
 Oinophila
 Opogona
 Phaeoses
 Phruriastis
 Tineomigma Gozmány, 2004
 Wegneria

Meessiinae
 Afrocelestis
 Agnathosia
 Agoraula
 Augolychna
 Bathroxena
 Clinograptis
 Diachorisia
 Doleromorphia
 Drimylastis
 Emblematodes
 Epactris
 Eudarcia

 Galachrysis
 Homosetia
 Homostinea
 Hybroma
 Infurcitinea
 Ischnoscia
 Isocorypha
 Leucomele
 Lichenotinea
 Matratinea
 Mea
 Meneessia

 Montetinea
 Nannotinea
 Novotinea
 Oenoe
 Oxylychna
 Pompostolella
 Protodarcia
 Stenoptinea
 Tenaga
 Trissochyta
 Unilepidotricha
 Xeringinia

Myrmecozelinae
 Ateliotum
 Analytarcha
 Cephimallota
 syn. Anemallota
 syn. Aphimallota
 syn. Cephitinea
 Cinnerethica
 Contralissa
 Coryptilum
 Criticonoma
 Dicanica
 Dinica
 Drosica
 Ellochotis
 Endromarmata
 Euagophleps
 Exoplisis

 Gerontha
 Haplotinea (tentatively placed here)
 Ippa
 Ischnuridia
 Janseana
 Machaeropteris
 Mesopherna
 Metapherna
 Mimoscopa
 Moerarchis
 Myrmecozela

 Pachyarthra
 Pararhodobates
 Phthoropoea
 Platysceptra
 Propachyarthra
 Rhodobates
 Sarocrania
 Scalmatica
 Timaea
 Tineovertex
 Tracheloteina

Nemapogoninae
 Archinemapogon
 Gaedikeia
 Hyladaula
 Nemapogon
 Nemaxera
 Neurothaumasia
 Peritrana
 Triaxomasia
 Triaxomera
 Vanna
Perissomasticinae
 Cylicobathra
 Ectabola
 Edosa
 Hyperbola
 Neoepiscardia
 Perissomastix
 Phalloscardia
 Sphallesthasis Gozmány, 1959
 Theatrochora

Scardiinae
 Afroscardia
 Amorophaga
 Archyala Meyrick, 1889
 Bythocrates
 Cnismorectis
 Coniastis
 Cranaodes
 Daviscardia
 Diataga
 Dorata
 Hilaroptera Gozmány, 1969
 Leptozancla Meyrick, 1920
 Montescardia
 Morophaga Herrich-Schäffer, 1853
 Pelecystola Meyrick, 1920
 Scardia
 Scardiella
 Semeoloncha Gozmány, 1968
 Tinissa Walker, 1864
 Trigonarchis
 Vespitinea

Setomorphinae
 Lindera
 Prosetomorpha
 Setomorpha

Siloscinae
 Autochthonus Walsingham, 1891
 Organodesma Gozmány, 1965
 Silosca Gozmány, 1965
Stathmopolitinae
 Stathmopolitis
Teichobiinae
 Dinochora
 Ectropoceros
 Psychoides

Tineinae
 Acridotarsa
 Anomalotinea
 Asymphyla
 Ceratobia
 Ceratophaga
 Ceratuncus
 Crypsithyris
 Crypsithyrodes
 Eccritothrix
 Elatobia
 Enargocrasis
 Eremicola
 Graphicoptila
 Hippiochaetes

 Kangerosithyris
 Lipomerinx
 Metatinea
 Miramonopis
 Monopis
 Nearolyma
 Niditinea
 Ocnophilella
 Phereoeca
 Praeacedes
 Pringleophaga
 Proterodesma
 Proterospastis

 Reisserita
 Stemagoris
 Tetrapalpus
 Thomintarra
 Tinea
 Tinemelitta
 Tineola
 Tineomigma
 Trichophaga
 Tryptodema
 Wyoma
 Xerantica

Genera incertae sedis
These fungus moths have not been assigned to a subfamily with a reasonable amount of certainty:

 Acanthocheira
 Acritotilpha
 Afghanotinea
 Amathyntis
 Ancystrocheira
 Antigambra
 Antipolistes
 Apreta
 Archyala
 Argyrocorys
 Astrogenes
 Axiagasta
 Barymochtha
 Basanasca
 Bascantis
 Brithyceros
 Catalectis
 Catapsilothrix
 Cataxipha
 Catazetema
 Cervaria
 Chionoreas
 Clepticodes
 Colpocrita
 Compsocrita
 Cosmeombra
 Cryphiotechna
 Crypsitricha
 Cubotinea
 Cycloponympha (often placed in Lyonetiidae)
 Dasmophora
 Dolerothera
 Drastea (often placed in Acrolophidae)
 Dyotopasta
 Ecpeptamena
 Endeixis
 Endophthora
 Ephedroxena
 Episyrta
 Eriozancla
 Erysimaga
 Eschatotypa
 Eucrotala
 Eugennaea
 Euprora
 Exonomasis
 Glaucostolella
 Gourbia
 Graphidivalva
 Habrophila
 Hapalothyma
 Harmotona
 Hecatompeda
 Heloscopa (often placed in Oecophoridae)
 Heterostasis
 Hilaroptera
 Histiovalva
 Homalopsycha
 Homodoxus
 Hoplocentra
 Hyalaula
 Hypoplesia
 Leptonoma
 Lepyrotica
 Leucophasma
 Liopycnas
 Lithopsaestis
 Lysiphragma
 Lysitona
 Marmaroxena
 Melodryas
 Merunympha
 Miarotagmata
 Minicorona
 Monachoptilas
 Mythoplastis
 Nesophylacella
 Nonischnoscia
 Nothogenes
 Nyctocyrmata
 Ochetoxena
 Ogmocoma
 Orocrypsona
 Otochares
 Oxymachaeris
 Pachydyta
 Panthytarcha
 Pedaliotis
 Pelecystola
 Peristactis
 Petasactis
 Pezetaera
 Philagraulella
 Phryganeopsis
 Plaesiostola
 Plemyristis
 Polypsecta
 Probatostola
 Proboloptila
 Protagophleps
 Protaphreutis
 Prothinodes
 Psecadioides
 Pyloetis
 Randominta
 Ranohira
 Rungsiodes
 Sagephora
 Scardia
 Sciomystis
 Setiarcha
 Sphecioses
 Stryphnodes
 Syncraternis
 Syngeneta
 Syrmologa
 Taeniodictys (often placed in Lyonetiidae)
 Tephrosara
 Tetanostola
 Thallostoma
 Thisizima
 Thomictis
 Thyrsochares
 Tomara
 Trachyrrhopala
 Trachytyla
 Transmixta
 Trichearias
 Trierostola
 Trithamnora
 Xylesthia
 Xystrologa
 Zonochares
 Zymologa

Fossil record
†Architinea Rebel, 1934
†Architinea balticella Rebel, 1934
†Architinea sepositella Rebel, 1934
†Dysmasiites Kusnezov, 1941
†Dysmasiites carpenteri Kusnezov, 1941
†Electromeessia Kozlov, 1987
†Electromeessia zagulijaevi Kozlov, 1987 (Baltic region, Eocene Amber)
†Glessoscardia Kusnezov, 1941
†Glessoscardia gerasimovi Kusnezov, 1941
†Martynea Kusnezov, 1941
†Martynea rebeli Kusnezov, 1941
†Monopibaltia Skalski, 1974
†Monopibaltia ignitella Skalski, 1974 (Baltic region, Eocene Amber)
†Palaeoinfurcitinea Kozlov, 1987
†Palaeoinfurcitinea rohdendorfi Kozlov, 1987 (Russia, Eocene Amber)
†Palaeoscardiites Kusnezov, 1941
†Palaeoscardiites mordvilkoi Kusnezov, 1941
†Palaeotinea Kozlov, 1987
†Palaeotinea rasnitsyni Kozlov, 1987
†Paratriaxomasia Jarzembowski, 1980
†Paratriaxomasia solentensis Jarzembowski, 1980
†Proscardiites Kusnezov, 1941
†Proscardiites martynovi Kusnezov, 1941
†Pseudocephitinea Kozlov, 1987
†Pseudocephitinea svetlanae Kozlov, 1987 (Russia, Eocene Amber)
†Scardiites Kusnezov, 1941
†Scardiites meyricki Kusnezov, 1941
†Simulotenia Skalski, 1977
†Simulotenia intermedia Skalski, 1977
†Tillyardinea Kusnezov, 1941
†Tillyardinea eocaenica Kusnezov, 1941
Tinea Linnaeus, 1758
†Tinea antique Rebel, 1822
†Tineitella T. B. Fletcher, 1940
†Tineitella crystalli Kawall, 1876 (originally in Tineites)
†Tineitella sucinacius Kozlov, 1987 (originally in Tineites)
†Tineolamima Rebel, 1934
†Tineolamima aurella Rebel, 1934
†Tineosemopsis Skalski, 1974
†Tineosemopsis decurtatus Skalski, 1974

References

 Global Taxonomic Database of Tineidae
 Common Clothes Moth
 A Caterpillar that Eats Tortoise Shells
 Tineid of Korea(closed, 2005~2019.12.23)
 Fauna Europaea

Further reading 
Key works

Dugdale, J.S., 1988. Lepidoptera - annotated catalogue and keys of family-group taxa. Fauna of New Zealand, 14: 1–262.
Gaedike, R. 1983. Zur Kenntnis der paläarktischen Tineiden Die Gattung Infurcitinea Spuler, 1910 (Lepidoptera). Entomologische Abhandlungen, Staatliches Museum für Tierkunde, Dresden, 46: 121–150.
Gaedike, R. 1985. Beitrag zur Kenntnis der paläarktischen Tineiden: Gattung Obesoceras Petersen, 1957 (Lepidoptera). Entomologische Abhandlungen, Staatliches Museum für Tierkunde, Dresden, 48: 167–181.
Hinton, H.E. 1956. The larvae of the species of Tineidae of economic importance. Bulletin of Entomological Research, 47: 251–346.
Leraut, P., 1985. Mise a jour de la liste des Tineides de la faune de France. Entomologica Gallica, 1(4): 319–325.
Petersen, G. 1957–8. Die Genitalien der paläarktischen Tineiden. Beiträge zur Entomologie, 7: 55–176, 338–380, 557–595; 8: 111–118, 398–430.
Robinson, G.S. 1979. Clothes-moths of the Tinea pellionella complex: a revision of the world's species (Lepidoptera: Tineidae). Bulletin of the British Museum (Natural History) Entomology, 38: 57–128, figs 1–103.
Zagulajev, A.K. 1960. Tineidae; part 3 - subfamily Tineinae. [In Russian.] Fauna SSSR, 78: 1–267, 231 figs, 3 pls. [Translation, 1975, New Delhi.]
Zagulajev, A.K. 1964. Tineidae; part 2 - subfamily Nemapogoninae. [In Russian.] Fauna SSSR, 86: 1–424, 385 figs, 1 pl. [Translation, 1968, Jerusalem.]
Zagulajev, A.K. 1973. Tineidae; part 4 - subfamily Scardiinae. [In Russian.] Fauna SSSR, 104: 1–126, 99 figs, 2 pls.
Zagulajev, A.K. 1975. Tineidae; part 5 - subfamily Myrmecozelinae. [In Russian.] Fauna SSSR, 108: 1–426, 319 figs, 8 pls. [Translation, 1988, New Delhi.]
Zagulajev, A.K. 1979. Tineidae; part 6 - subfamily Meessiinae. [In Russian.] Fauna SSSR, 119: 1–409.
Zagulajev A K. 1988 English translation (original 1975). Clothes Moths (Tineidae) (English translation of Nastoyaschie Moli (Tineidae)).Akademiya Nauk SSSr, Zoologicheskii Institut, New series No. 108

External links 

 
Moth families
Household pest insects